Rhys Davies may refer to:
Rhys Davies (writer) (1901–1978), Welsh novelist and short story writer
Rhys Davies (engineer) (died 1838), American engineer in Richmond, Virginia associated with the Tredegar Iron Works
Rhys Davies (politician), British Labour Member of Parliament for Westhoughton from 1921 to 1951
Rhys Davies (golfer) (born 1985), Welsh golfer
Rhys Davies (canoeist), British slalom canoeist
Rhys Davies (rugby union, born February 1998), Welsh rugby union player
Rhys Davies (rugby union, born November 1998), Welsh rugby union player

See also
Arthur Rhys-Davids (1897–1917), Air Ace
Rees Davies (1938–2005), Welsh historian
John Rhys-Davies (born 1944), Welsh actor
John Rhys Davies (priest) (1890–1953), Welsh priest